The Green Book is the third studio album by American hip-hop duo Twiztid, released on July 1, 2003.

Background
In 2003 Twiztid left Psychopathic Records and created Majik Recordz. After the label went under Twiztid returned to Psychopathic Records seamlessly, almost like they never left. Upon returning they recorded "The Green Book". The album was an instant hit with Juggalos, charting at 52 on the Billboard 200. The album features artists: Shaggy 2 Dope, E-40, Esham, Tech N9ne, Violent J, Layzie Bone, Blaze Ya Dead Homie, Anybody Killa and Bushwick Bill. The album was produced by: The Soundsquad, Fritz "The Cat" Van Kosky, Monoxide Child, Mike E. Clark, Legz Diamond (on guitar), Marco Brushstein (on guitar), and Lil Pig (on drums).

Release
The album was rereleased by Majik Ninja Entertainment on August 19, 2016. It was released on CD, Cassette, and Vinyl with a version only found on the Twiztid-Store.

Reception

Jamie Spaniolo has referred to the album as a "Juggalo favorite". Rob Theakston wrote for AllMusic that while The Green Book was an improvement over Insane Clown Posse's previous album, "Twiztid sounds like a half-hearted attempt at a flaccid Kid Rock or Everlast recording session gone very wrong. Even appearances by the main juggalos themselves can't save this ship from sinking."

Track listing

Personnel

Twiztid
Shaggy 2 Dope – vocals (7) 
E-40 – vocals (8) 
Esham – vocals (9) 
Tech N9ne – vocals (12) 
Violent J – vocals (13) 
Layzie Bone – vocals (15) 
Blaze Ya Dead Homie – vocals (16) 
Anybody Killa – vocals (17) 
Bushwick Bill – vocals (17)

Production
The Soundsquad – (1, 9, 16, 19)
Fritz "The Cat" Van Kosky – (2, 3, 4, 6, 7, 10, 11, 12, 13, 14, 15, 17, 18, 19, 20)
Monoxide Child – (4, 7, 8, 10, 15, 20)
Mike E. Clark – (5)
Legz Diamond (guitar) – (14)
Marco Brushstein (guitar) – (20)
Lil Pig (drums) – (20)

Charts

References

2003 albums
Twiztid albums
Psychopathic Records albums